Rowland Bateman (circa 1737 – 1803) was an Irish politician.

Bateman represented Tralee as a Member of Parliament in the Irish House of Commons between 1761 and 1768. He then sat for Kerry from 1776 to 1783.

References

Year of birth unknown
1803 deaths
Irish MPs 1761–1768
Irish MPs 1776–1783
Members of the Parliament of Ireland (pre-1801) for County Kerry constituencies
Year of birth uncertain